Local elections were held in Las Piñas on Monday, May 13, 2019, as a part of the 2019 Philippine general election. Voters elected candidates for the local elective posts in the city: the mayor, vice mayor, the congressman, and the councilors, six of them in the two districts of the city.

There are a total of 208,736 people who voted out of the 328,384  registered voters.

Background
Incumbent Mayor Imelda Aguilar sought for her second term, and challenged by Luis "Louie" Casimiro, Conrado Miranda, and former Councilor Benjamin Gonzales.

Incumbent Vice Mayor Luis "Louie" Bustamante is term limited and ran as councilor in city's Second District. His party nominated April Aguilar-Nery, daughter of Mayor Imelda Aguilar, to run for his place. Aguilar-Nery was challenged by Antonio Abellar Jr.

Incumbent Representative Mark Villar was appointed Secretary of the Department of Public Works and Highways, while his wife Emmeline Aglipay-Villar was designated as interim representative. Their party nominated Camille Villar, sister of Mark Villar. Villar was challenged by Jerry Delos Reyes.

Results

For Mayor
Incumbent Mayor Imelda Aguilar is sought her second term, with 170,972 votes garnered.

For Vice Mayor
Incumbent Vice Mayor Luis "Louie" Bustamante is term-limited and ran as city councilor for the Second District. His party nominated April Aguilar-Nery, daughter of the incumbent Mayor Imelda Aguilar. Aguilar-Nery won with 161,789 votes.

For Representative, Lone District
In August 2016, a few months after his re-election, Representative Mark Villar was appointed Secretary of the Department of Public Works and Highways, while his wife Emmeline Aglipay-Villar was designated as interim representative. His sister, Camille Villar, ran for his place. Villar won with 173,917 votes.

For Councilor

First District

|-bgcolor=black
|colspan=5|

Second District

|-bgcolor=black
|colspan=5|

References

2019 Philippine local elections
Elections in Las Piñas
May 2019 events in the Philippines
2019 elections in Metro Manila